Steven of Wick (Transport Company established 1920) known as D. Steven & Son is a Scottish company from the town of Wick, Scotland that mainly transports seafood.

History
The company began in 1920 in the town of Wick in the north of Scotland. They began with a horse and cart at Wick harbour where the still have a depot today. The town where the originated, Wick, was once the biggest fishing port in the world. Surprisingly Steven of Wick did not start in the fish business. They started in the farming business.

Competition with Hendry of Wick
Steven of Wick were at competition with other Wick contractors Hendry of Wick. They were both two of Scotland's oldest hauliers to date. Hendry of Wick also had their depot at the Wick harbour. Hendry of Wick and Steven of Wick were both useful and successful companies that brought on the competition that went on for decades.

Buyout of Hendry of Wick
In the 1990s Steven of Wick bought out Hendry Of Wick adding to their fleet.

Present day
Steven of Wick are mostly known to many as D. Steven & Son. They now have four depots; their smallest one is actually in Wick. Their biggest one is Scrabster about 45 minutes from Wick, and also one in Glasgow and Aberdeen. D. Steven & Son now transport good around the UK and Europe. D. Steven & Sons' fleet consists of nearly 40 HGVs. In 2003, they were named Scottish European Haulier of the year and, in 2012, Scotland's Top Trailer fleet.

References

External links
Official website

Transport companies of Scotland
1920 establishments in Scotland
Companies based in Highland (council area)